The Governor of Calshot Castle was a military officer who commanded the fortifications at Calshot Castle, a Device Fort of Henry VIII guarding Southampton Water. It was in military use until 1956.

Governors of Calshot Castle
Capt. Richard Smith
1650s: Thomas Bettesworth
1660–1661: Francis Burghill
1661–1672: Lord Henry Paulet
1673–1689: James Halsall
1689–1693: Francis Paulet
1693–aft. 1756: William Knapton
1761–1787: Sir Harry Burrard of Walhampton
1787–1813: Sir Harry Burrard of Lymington
1813–1837: Richard Lambart, 7th Earl of Cavan
office abolished

References

Military history of Hampshire
Calshot Castle